Greatest Hits Live is a live album by Hall & Oates, released in 2001.

Reception
Recorded during their 1982 tour to promote the album Private Eyes, Stephen Thomas Erlewine of AllMusic says Greatest Hits Live is "a snapshot of an underrated band on-stage at their peak" and "an entertaining sidenote in their catalog."

Track listing 
 "Did It in a Minute" - 3:55
 "How Does It Feel to Be Back" - 4:40
 "Diddy Doo Wop (I Hear the Voices)" - 3:45
 "Mano a Mano" - 3:52
 "Rich Girl" - 3:10
 "She's Gone" - 5:22
 "Kiss Is on My List" - 4:42
 "I Can't Go for That (No Can Do)" - 6:45
 "Sara Smile" - 6:08
 "Wait for Me" - 5:46
 "Private Eyes" - 3:20
 "You've Lost that Lovin' Feelin'" - 5:33
 "You Make My Dreams" - 4:02
 "United State" - 4:23

Personnel 
 Producers – Daryl Hall and John Oates
 Compilation – Paul Williams and Jeremy Holiday for House of Hist Productions. Ltd
 Mastering – Bill Lacey at Digital Sound & Picture (New York City)
 Digital Transfers – Mike Hartry
 Project Director – Victoria Sarro
 Photography – Sam Emerson
 Art direction and design – JAJ Associates

The Band
 Daryl Hall – vocals, keyboards, guitars
 John Oates – vocals, guitars
 Charles DeChant – keyboards, saxophones, backing vocals 
 Larry Fast – keyboards 
 G. E. Smith – lead guitars, backing vocals 
 Tom "T-Bone" Wolk – bass guitar, backing vocals 
 Mickey Curry – drums

References

2001 live albums
Hall & Oates live albums
RCA Records live albums